Merriweather is a surname deriving from the Middle English merie, meaning 'merry pleasant' and wether, meaning weather.

Notable people with the surname "Merriweather" include:

Alfred Merriweather (1918–1999), British missionary and politician
Big Maceo Merriweather (1905–1953), American musician
Brian Merriweather (born 1978), American basketball player
Daniel Merriweather (born 1982), Australian singer-songwriter
Kaevon Merriweather (born 1999), American football player
Katrina Merriweather (born 1979), American basketball coach
Marjorie Merriweather Post (1887–1973), American entrepreneur
Mike Merriweather (born 1960), American football player
William Merriweather Peña (1919–2018), American architect

See also
Meriweather, a page for people with the surname "Meriweather"
Meriwether (name), a page for people with the surname "Meriwether"

Notes